Cains is an unincorporated community in Salisbury Township in Lancaster County, Pennsylvania, United States. It is located at the intersection of Pennsylvania Route 340 and Cains Road/Churchtown Road.

References

Unincorporated communities in Lancaster County, Pennsylvania
Unincorporated communities in Pennsylvania